Edward Joseph "Ace" Fallenstein (December 22, 1908 – November 24, 1971) is a former Major League Baseball pitcher. He played two seasons with the Philadelphia Phillies (1931) and Boston Braves (1933).

References

External links

Boston Braves players
Philadelphia Phillies players
Major League Baseball pitchers
Newark Bears (IL) players
Providence Grays (minor league) players
Scranton Miners players
Jersey City Skeeters players
Buffalo Bisons (minor league) players
Baseball players from Newark, New Jersey
1908 births
1971 deaths